St. Thomas is a city in southwestern Ontario, Canada. It gained its city charter on March 4, 1881. The city is also the seat for Elgin County, although it is independent of the county.

At the time of the 2021 Census, the population of the city was 42,918.

History

The city, located at the intersection of two historical roads, was first settled in 1810. It was named the seat of the new Elgin County in 1844 and was incorporated as a village in 1852, then as a town in 1861. In 1881 St. Thomas became a city. It was named after Thomas Talbot who helped promote the development of this region during the early 19th century.

The founder of the settlement that became St. Thomas was Capt. Daniel Rapelje, descendant of a Walloon family settled in New Amsterdam, now New York City, at its inception in the seventeenth century. In 1820, Rapelje, the town's first settler, divided his land into town lots suitable for a village. Owner of the New England Mill, Rapelje subsequently donated two acres of land for the building of Old St. Thomas Church.

In 1871, the developing village of Millersburg, which included these lands east of the London and Port Stanley Railway, amalgamated with St. Thomas.

In the late 19th century and early 20th century several railways were constructed through the city, and St. Thomas became an important railway junction. A total of 26 railways have passed through the city since the first railway was completed in 1856. In the 1950s and 1960s, with the decline of the railway as a mode of transportation, other industry began to locate in the city, principally primary and secondary automotive manufacturing.

Jumbo the circus elephant, said to be the world's biggest elephant at the time, died here on September 15, 1885, shortly after being hit by a locomotive. There is a life-sized commemorative statue that was erected in 1985.

In 1824, Charles Duncombe and John Rolph established the first medical school in Upper Canada, in St. Thomas, under the patronage of Colonel Thomas Talbot. Duncombe's house now forms part of The Elgin Military Museum complex. Between 1881 and 1988 the city had a private woman's school operating called Alma College which was destroyed by fire in 2008.

St. Thomas' late 19th- early 20th century architecture includes the Elgin County Court House, Wellington Street public school, Myrtle St. School (demolished in 2014), Balaclava St. School, Elmdale School and its city hall, most designated heritage properties and all designed by former resident Neil R. Darrach.

Government
Joe Preston is the current mayor of St. Thomas.  The City Council consists of the mayor and eight City Councillors, all elected at large, meaning Councillors are elected on a citywide basis.

Military
31 Combat Engineer Regiment (The Elgins) was created in 1997 when the former Elgin Regiment (RCAC) was re-roled from an armour tasking. The regiment had been associated with St. Thomas since its creation; St. Thomas is currently home to one of its two component field squadrons. St. Thomas Armoury is a recognized Federal Heritage building 1992 on the Register of the Government of Canada Heritage Buildings.

Demographics

According to the 2011 census, St. Thomas had a population of 37,905 people in 2011, which was an increase of 5.6% from the 2006 census count. The median household income in 2016 for St. Thomas was $71,356.75

In the 2016 Census, more than 10,000 people were age 60 or over.

Education
Fanshawe College has a satellite campus in St. Thomas. Catholic schools are controlled by the London District Catholic School Board and public schools are controlled by the Thames Valley District School Board.   Arthur Voaden Secondary School, Central Elgin Collegiate Institute and Parkside Collegiate Institute are the three public high schools.  St. Joseph's High School is a Catholic high school.  There are two independent Christian elementary schools, Kings Academy and St. Thomas Community Christian School.

Economy
The local economy has been dominated by automotive manufacturing, with two plants operated by Magna International, the Ford St. Thomas Assembly in nearby Talbotville, and a Sterling Trucks assembly plant. However, the 2008 global recession that impacted the auto sector ultimately trickled down to the city; the Sterling plant closed in March 2009, and the Ford plant closed in late 2011 for a loss of 1,400 jobs. A number of other, smaller auto parts plants also closed as a result, putting thousands more out of work. This had a domino effect on the other part manufacturers in town, such as Lear Seating.  One automotive materials supplier, A. Schulman, had previously closed its local manufacturing plant in 2008, one of the first actions of a new CEO installed in January.

Masco Canada's consolidation of their Canadian operations into the former Sterling Truck assembly plant in 2010 and Toyota supplier Takumi Stamping Canada's expansion in the same year brought over 500 jobs to St. Thomas.

A report in June 2019 indicated that a plant for cross-laminated timber (CLT) would be built in town, providing over 60 jobs. The estimated cost of the automated plant was $32 million.

The town's Economic Development Corporation has attracted film crews, particularly to the former psychiatric hospital (the Regional Mental Health Centre) on Sunset Drive as a location for filming. A January 2020 report indicated that productions filming in the town have included The Boys, Guillermo del Toro's Scary Stories to Tell in the Dark and most recently, a film featuring Jason Momoa that was planning to film in town, frequently outdoors, from February to June 2020.

Transportation

St. Thomas is accessible via Ontario Highway 3 and Ontario Highway 4, the latter of which provides access to London, Highway 401 and Highway 402.

Local Motion - Railway City Transit, which includes both conventional bus service and paratransit, is owned by the city and staffed and operated by Voyageur Transportation.

The city is served by the St. Thomas Municipal Airport (YQS), just east in the Municipality of Central Elgin. There are no scheduled flights; the airport  is used for general aviation only. A bi-annual large-scale air show takes place at the St. Thomas Municipal Airport.

From 1978 to 1979 Canada Southern Railway Station served as the only Canadian stop for the short-lived Amtrak Niagara Rainbow route.

Media
St. Thomas has several media outlets based in the city. The St. Thomas Times-Journal is the city's newspaper, owned by Sun Media (Quebecor).  
The St. Thomas - Elgin Weekly News is a weekly newspaper published in St. Thomas, that is distributed for free to all residents of St. Thomas and Elgin County. The Elgin County Market is a weekly publication that is also distributed for free to all residents of St. Thomas and Elgin County, it features various local business flyers and advertisements.

Rogers Cable operates a local community channel consisting mostly of local and dedicated volunteers. CFPL-DT, branded as CTV Two London, covers many news stories from St. Thomas.

St. Thomas's only local commercial radio station, CKZM-FM 94.1 FM was launched on May 20, 2011. Also a low-power FM radio station — VF8016, 90.1 MHz — broadcasts religious activities from Faith Baptist Church of St. Thomas. CFHK-FM, branded as 103.1 Fresh FM, is also licensed to St. Thomas, although its programming originates from London and targets all of southwestern Ontario.

Establish Media is the newest media outlet based in St. Thomas. They produce digital content which they distribute primarily through social channels.

Sports
There is a dragway called St. Thomas Raceway Park. The dragway is located a reasonable distance away from the town and minutes east of the historical community of Sparta.

Current franchises 

St. Thomas has been home to semi-professional and professional sports franchises in baseball & hockey, the St. Thomas Storm (Intercounty Baseball League) and the St. Thomas Wildcats (Colonial Hockey League)

Climate

Parks

There are two major parks in the city: Pinafore Park in the south, beside Pinafore Lake; and Waterworks Park in the north, which is straddled by Kettle Creek and the Waterworks Reservoir nearby.

The Trans Canada Trail goes through St. Thomas, with a pavilion located in Jonas Street Park.

The Lions Club Dog Park is located at the far west end of main street, at 25 Talbot Road. The park is managed by the St. Thomas Dog Owners Association (STDOA) in partnership with the City of St. Thomas. The park is open from dawn to dusk, daily.

The Kettle Creek Dog Park, opened in July 2014, is located just north of St Thomas, off Highbury on Mapleton Line, 200 metres beyond Dan Paterson Conservation Area. The park is open daily from dawn to dusk and boasts a large fenced in park, a fenced-in area for small dogs and a separate fenced-in area for one-on-one play. The park is managed by Kettle Creek Conservation Authority in partnership with STDOA, the Municipality of Central Elgin and the City of St Thomas.

V.A. Barrie Park, located on Sunset Drive, and Waterworks Park include popular Disc Golf courses.

Cultural activities
The Elgin Military Museum is located in the west end of St. Thomas. While the museum recounts the stories of Elgin County residents from the War of 1812 to Afghanistan, it also includes two M113 Armoured Personnel Carriers and a collection of some 600 UN and NATO badges described by one appraiser as "the best collection I have seen outside of the UN in New York". In late 2009, The Elgin Military Museum began the process to acquire the Cold War Oberon Class Submarine HMCS Ojibwa, The submarine is planned to be stationed outside of St. Thomas in Port Burwell.

The Elgin County Railway Museum is located in central St. Thomas.

St. Thomas is also home to the North America Railway Hall of Fame, which is located in the CASO train station.  The station was built in the 1870s and was a centre of travel between New York City and Chicago.  It is located on Talbot Street downtown.

The Elgin Theatre Guild is located at 40 Princess Avenue, and is home to a thriving community theatre, as well as hosting small musical groups.  The building is a former church, built in 1907 by architect Neil Darrach.  In 2001, St. Thomas City Council designated 40 Princess Avenue as a building of historic and architectural value in the City of St. Thomas.

St. Thomas is home to the Railway City Brewing Company, one of 29 members of the Ontario Craft Brewers.

St. Thomas' sister city is Bowling Green, OH.

Heritage buildings 
As a county seat and major railway junction, St. Thomas was an important and vibrant town in early Ontario. As such, the city has a significant number of pre-1914 heritage buildings.

Public 

 St. Thomas Town Hall, 1899 (545 Talbot St.)
 Elgin County Courthouse, 1898 (4 Wellington St.)
 St. Thomas Carnegie Library, 1904 (9 Mondamin St.)
 Elgin County Registry Office, 1874 (Gladstone Ave.)
 St. Thomas Armoury, 1901 (40 Wilson Ave.)
 Public Utilities Commission Building, 1916 (36 St. Catherine St.)

Religious 

 St. Thomas Anglican, 1823 (55 Walnut St)
 Trinity Anglican, 1877 (55 Southwick St.)
 St. John's Anglican, 1909 (20 Flora St.)
 Knox Presbyterian, 1883 (55 Hincks St.)
 Alma Street Presbyterian, 1891 (94 Kains St.)
 Central Methodist, 1897 (135 Wellington St.)
 Holy Angels Roman Catholic, 1911 (502 Talbot Street)
 Centre Street Baptist, 1879 (28 Southwick St.)
 Church of Christ, 1906 (40 Princess Ave.)

Education 

 Wellington Street Public School, 1898 (50 Wellington St.)
 Balaclava Street School, 1898 (20 Balaclava St.)
 Arthur Voaden Vocational School, 1925 (41 Flora St.)

Transportation 

 St. Thomas Station (Canada Southern Ry.), 1871 (750 Talbot St.)

Lost heritage 

 Alma College, 1881 (96 Moore St.) – burned down 2008
 Myrtle Street School, 1903 (43 Myrtle St.) – demolished 2014
 Amasa Wood Hospital, 1891 (45 Pearl St.)– demolished 1953
 St. Thomas Collegiate Institute, 1902 (35 Elysian St.) – demolished 1967
 First Methodist, 1873 (26 St George St.) – burned down 1946
 St. Thomas Post Office, 1883 (403 Talbot St.)– demolished 1958

Notable people

 Gopal Bhatnagar, cardiac surgeon, entrepreneur and public health advocate
 Mary Ann Cunningham (1841-1930), social reformer and temperance activist
Bob Emslie, (1859–1943) pitcher in Major League Baseball who also had a long career as an umpire
 Cory Emmerton, professional ice hockey player (Detroit Red Wings, Grand Rapids Griffins, Kingston Frontenacs)
 Jean Chamberlain Froese, obstetrician
 Elaine Goble (born 1956), Canadian visual artist
 Jack Graney, professional baseball player and broadcaster, namesake of the Jack Graney Award
 Paul Hackman (1953–1992), guitarist and songwriter from the rock band Helix
 Libby Hague, artist
 Dell Henderson, Hollywood actor of 304 films, director of 208 films and writer of 35
 Mitchell Hepburn (1896–1953), Premier of Ontario 1934–1942
 Dave Hudson, former professional ice hockey player (New York Islanders, Kansas City Scouts,  Colorado Rockies)
 D. J. Kennington, NASCAR driver
 Rachel McAdams, Oscar-nominated Hollywood actress
 Greg McKegg, professional ice hockey player for the Boston Bruins
 Stephen Ouimette, actor, director widely known for his work at the Stratford Festival
 Stephen J. Peters, politician, MPP for Elgin—Middlesex—London, former Minister of Labour (Ontario) and Minister of Agriculture and Food (Ontario), Speaker of the Ontario Legislature 2007–2011.
 Philip Francis Pocock, former Catholic archbishop of Toronto
 Janet and Greta Podleski, bestselling cookbook authors (Looneyspoons, Crazy Plates, Eat, Shrink & Be Merry!), Food Network hosts and Reader's Digest columnists
 Joe Preston, entrepreneur and member of parliament representing Elgin—Middlesex—London riding
 Helen Shaver, actress, director, producer (The Amityville Horror, The Color of Money, Judging Amy)
 Ned Sparks, (1883–1957) character actor, well known for his deadpan expression and deep gravelly voice
 David Shaw, former professional ice hockey player 
 Kenneth J. Summers, commander of Operation Friction
 Joe Thornton, professional ice hockey player (Florida Panthers, Toronto Maple Leafs, San Jose Sharks, Boston Bruins, Sault Ste. Marie Greyhounds, St. Thomas Stars)
 Aaron Walpole, third-place finisher in the third season of Canadian Idol
 Kari-Lynn Winters, children's book author, dramatist, literacy educator
John Wise (Ontario), PC (1935–2013), dairy cattle farmer and Federal Minister of Agriculture
 Marline Yan (1993-), actress and singer

See also 
 Coat of arms of St. Thomas, Ontario
 Port Stanley Terminal Rail

References

External links

 
Cities in Ontario
Single-tier municipalities in Ontario